Susanne Riesch (born 8 December 1987, in Garmisch-Partenkirchen, Bavaria, West Germany) is a former alpine ski racer.  She is the sister of Maria Höfl-Riesch, overall World Cup Champion for season 2010/2011. She is also the niece of Wolfgang Zimmerer who was a bobsledder during the 1960s and 1970s and who with Peter Utzschneider, won gold for West Germany at the Two-man bobsleigh during the 1972 Winter Olympics.

Riesch has won two podiums in the Alpine skiing world cup, both 3rd places in slalom during the 2009-2010 World Cup season (Åre, Sweden and Zagreb, Croatia).

In January 2015, ten months after her sister's retirement, Susanne Riesch announced that she was retiring due to struggling with injuries.

References

External links 
 
 
 

1987 births
Living people
Sportspeople from Garmisch-Partenkirchen
German female alpine skiers
Alpine skiers at the 2010 Winter Olympics
Olympic alpine skiers of Germany
21st-century German women